Carlos Gabriel Correa Viana (born 13 January 1968) is a Uruguayan retired footballer, and is the manager of Spanish club UD Los Garres.

A defensive midfielder, most of his professional career was spent in Spain where he played for five teams – amassing La Liga totals of 76 matches and four goals and 137/5 in Segunda División – subsequently coaching in its lower leagues.

Club career
Born in the country's capital, Montevideo, Correa played six years with local Club Atlético River Plate, switching to another side in the city in 1989, national powerhouse Peñarol. After just one season he moved abroad, joining Spain's Real Murcia in the country's second division and dropping down to the third level in his second year, due to irregularities.

In the middle of 1993, Correa moved straight into La Liga with Real Valladolid, his competition debut coming on 5 September in a 0–1 home loss against Sporting de Gijón. In the following four years, he would bounce back and forth between divisions one and two with CP Mérida.

Correa signed with Sevilla FC in summer 1998, at the age of 30. In August of the following year he suffered a serious Achilles tendon injury which would put him out of action for more than one year, after which he made a brief comeback with his fifth club in Spain, Hércules CF (third division), retiring shortly after.

In 2005, Correa started his coaching career, first with the youth sides then as assistant to former club Murcia. He coached the team for exactly one match in the 2005–06 season before they appointed Sergije Krešić, with the Uruguayan returning to the youth levels.

For the next three years, Correa managed in the lower leagues of Spain, being fired from Lorca Deportiva CF in mid-October 2008.

International career
Correa made 19 appearances for Uruguay during two years, representing the nation at the 1990 FIFA World Cup (one match) and the 1989 Copa América. His debut came on 2 November 1988 in a friendly against Chile in Concepción, being sent off in the 1–1 draw.

Personal life
Correa's daughter, Yannel, was also a footballer.}}</ref>

References

External links

National team data 

1968 births
Living people
Footballers from Montevideo
Uruguayan footballers
Association football midfielders
Uruguayan Primera División players
Club Atlético River Plate (Montevideo) players
Peñarol players
La Liga players
Segunda División players
Segunda División B players
Real Murcia players
Real Valladolid players
CP Mérida footballers
Sevilla FC players
Hércules CF players
Uruguay international footballers
1990 FIFA World Cup players
Uruguayan expatriate footballers
Expatriate footballers in Spain
Uruguayan expatriate sportspeople in Spain
Uruguayan football managers
Segunda División managers
Segunda División B managers
Tercera División managers
Tercera Federación managers
Real Murcia managers
Lorca Deportiva CF managers
UCAM Murcia CF managers
Uruguayan expatriate football managers
Expatriate football managers in Spain
Caravaca CF managers